Richard Timothy Durrett is an American mathematician known for his research and
books on mathematical probability theory, stochastic processes and their
application to mathematical ecology and population genetics.

Education and career 
He received his BS and MS at Emory University in 1972 and 1973 and his Ph.D. at Stanford University in 1976 under advisor Donald
Iglehart. From 1976 to 1985 he taught at UCLA. From 1985 until 2010 was on the faculty at Cornell University, where his students included Claudia Neuhauser. Since 2010, Durrett has been a professor at Duke University.

He was elected to the United States National Academy of Sciences in 2007. In 2012 he became a fellow of the American Mathematical Society.

Durrett is the founder of the Cornell Probability Summer Schools.

Selected publications

Books
 Durrett, R. Probability. Theory and examples.  Wadsworth & Brooks/Cole, Pacific Grove, CA (1991). 453 pp.  ; 4th edition, 2010
 Durrett, R. Probability models for DNA sequence evolution. Springer-Verlag, New York (2002). 240 pp.  ; 2nd edition, 2008
 Durrett, R. Stochastic Calculus: A Practical Introduction. CRC Press (1996). 341 pp. 
 Durrett, R. Random Graph Dynamics. Cambridge University Press (2006). 222 pp.

Papers
 
  (This article has over 1100 citations.)

References

External links
 Personal Home Page at Duke University.
 Cornell Probability Summer Schools.

20th-century American mathematicians
21st-century American mathematicians
Fellows of the American Mathematical Society
Members of the United States National Academy of Sciences
Cornell University faculty
Probability theorists
Living people
Emory University alumni
Year of birth missing (living people)
Stanford University alumni
University of California, Los Angeles faculty
Duke University faculty
American mathematicians